Bilberry is a village in mid Cornwall, England, United Kingdom. It is approximately five miles (8 km) north of St Austell on the A391 road in the china clay extraction area. It is in the civil parish of Roche.

References

Villages in Cornwall